The Texas Tech University System is a state university system in Texas consisting of five universities in the state of Texas, of which three are general-academic universities, Texas Tech University, Angelo State University and Midwestern State University, and two health-related institutions, Texas Tech University Health Sciences Center and Texas Tech University Health Sciences Center El Paso. Headquartered in Lubbock, Texas, the Texas Tech University System is a $2.5 billion enterprise focused on advancing higher education, health care, research and outreach with approximately 21,000 employees, more than 63,000 students, nearly 370,000 alumni and an endowment valued at $1.7 billion. In its short history (established in 1996), the TTU System has grown tremendously and is nationally acclaimed, operating at 24 academic locations statewide and internationally.

History
On February 10, 1923, Texas Technological College (now named Texas Tech University) was founded, and that August, a committee selected to locate the institution in Lubbock. The Board of Directors of Texas Technological College (now named the Board of Regents of the Texas Tech University System) was established to oversee the institution.

In 1969, the Texas Tech University School of Medicine (now named Texas Tech University Health Sciences Center), was founded as separate multi-campus institution from Texas Tech University. It was also overseen by same board of regents as Texas Tech University.

In 1985, then state senator, and future TTU System chancellor, John T. Montford proposed the creation of the Texas Tech University System.

In 1999, the Texas Legislature formally established the Texas Tech University System, consisting of the same two institutions, overseen by the board of regents, and the newly created position of chancellor to provide leadership and support for both Texas Tech University, and Texas Tech University Health Sciences Center.

In 2007, Angelo State University left the Texas State University System and joined the Texas Tech University System. On May 18, 2013, Texas Tech University Health Sciences Center at El Paso was established as a standalone institution after previously being a regional site for TTUHSC in El Paso.

On August 6, 2020, the Texas Tech University System and Midwestern State University agreed to a memorandum of understanding to begin the process of MSU Texas becoming the fifth university to join the system. The process continued on June 8, 2021, when Governor Greg Abbott signed HB 1522 into law. Midwestern State officially became a component institution when HB 1522 went into effect on September 1, 2021.

Component institutions

Angelo State University

Angelo State University is a public university with an enrollment of 10,826 (fall 2021) located in San Angelo, Texas. It was founded in 1928 as a two-year college. In 1965, the school began offering four-year degrees and 10 years later became part of the Texas State University System.

Angelo State University offers 48 undergraduate degrees, 28 masters and two doctoral degree programs. The university is divided into five colleges, Health and Human Services, Arts and Humanities, Education, Graduate Studies and Research, Engineering and Business.

In March 2007, Rep. Drew Darby and Sen. Robert Duncan co-sponsored House Bill 3564, which aimed to realign Angelo State with the Texas Tech University System. The merger received widespread support in both Lubbock and San Angelo. The bill was approved by the full House on April 24, 2007, and by the Senate in a unanimous vote on May 15, 2007. On May 23, 2007, Gov. Rick Perry signed the bill. A companion amendment to the Texas Constitution went before voters on November 6, 2007, as Proposition 1, which passed 66.28 percent in favor to 33.72 percent against.

Midwestern State University

Midwestern State University is a public university in Wichita Falls, Texas with an enrollment of 5,797 (fall 2021). It is the only university in the state to become a member of the Council of Public Liberal Arts Colleges. The school was founded in 1922 as Wichita Falls Junior College and was renamed Hardin Junior College in 1937 when it moved to its present location off Taft Boulevard. In 1946, when a senior division was added, it was renamed Hardin College. In January 1950, the name changed to Midwestern University, with the junior college division remaining Hardin Junior College.

Texas Tech University

Texas Tech University was founded in 1923, is a public, coeducational, doctoral/research university, and is the system flagship. Current enrollment totals 40,666 students in fall 2021. The main campus is located in Lubbock, Texas, and is bordered by Marsha Sharp Freeway (4th Street), 19th Street, University Avenue, and Quaker Avenue. It operates several satellite campuses and centers outside of Lubbock, listed in the next section. Texas Tech University consists of 13 colleges and schools and offers 150 degree programs.

Texas Tech University Health Sciences Center

Texas Tech University Health Sciences Center was created as the Texas Tech University School of Medicine by the 61st Texas Legislature in 1969. In 1979, the charter was expanded to create the Texas Tech University Health Sciences Center. The university's enrollment was a record 5,423 in fall 2021. Texas Tech University Health Sciences Center has five schools and operates on six campuses in addition to the main campus in Lubbock, Texas. TTUHSC's five schools are the Graduate School of Biomedical Sciences, School of Health Professions, School of Medicine, School of Nursing and the Jerry H. Hodge School of Pharmacy, which is headquartered in Amarillo, Texas. The institution has campuses located in Abilene, Amarillo, Dallas, Lubbock, Midland and Odessa.

Texas Tech University Health Sciences Center El Paso

On May 18, 2013, Texas Tech University Health Sciences Center El Paso (TTUHSC El Paso) was established as a separate university from TTUHSC. The university is made up of four schools: Gayle Greve Hunt School of Nursing, Paul L. Foster School of Medicine,  L. Frederick Francis Graduate School of Biomedical Sciences and Woody L. Hunt School of Dental Medicine.

Governance and administration

Board of Regents
The government, control, and direction of the Texas Tech University System is vested in a nine-member Board of Regents appointed by the governor and confirmed by the legislature.  Each Regent serves a six-year term, and appointments are staggered so that three members of the Board's terms expire in odd-numbered years. In addition to the nine members, there also is a student regent who is appointed by the governor to serve a one-year term that begins on June 1 of each year.

In 1923, Governor Pat Neff appointed the first members of the Board of Directors of Texas Technological College (as the council was known until 1969). When the name of Texas Technological College was changed in 1969, so did the council to: Board of Regents of Texas Tech University. The council has been known by its current name, Board of Regents of the Texas Tech University System, after the Texas Tech University System was established in 1996.

Chancellor
The Chancellor is the chief executive officer of the Texas Tech University System appointed by, and responsible to, the Board of Regents. The Chancellor carries out the policies of the System as determined by the Regents and has direct responsibility for all aspects of the operations of the Texas Tech University System's six primary components: Texas Tech University, Texas Tech University Health Sciences Center, Angelo State University, Texas Tech University Health Sciences Center El Paso, Midwestern State University and the Texas Tech University System Administration.

The Texas Tech University System has had five Chancellors: John T. Montford, David Smith, Kent Hance, Robert L. Duncan, and Tedd L. Mitchell.

Presidents
The presidents of Texas Tech University, Texas Tech University Health Sciences Center, Angelo State University, Texas Tech University Health Sciences Center El Paso and Midwestern State University are appointed by the Chancellor and are the CEOs of their respective institutions and responsible for the strategic operation of each institution.

Campuses
The five institutions of the Texas Tech University System are located on multiple campuses and academic sites.

Angelo State University
 San Angelo, Texas

Midwestern State University
 Wichita Falls, Texas (main campus)
 Flower Mound, Texas

Texas Tech University
 Amarillo, Texas (School of Veterinary Medicine)
 Cleburne, Texas (Hill College campus)
 El Paso, Texas (College of Architecture branch)
 Escazú, San José, Costa Rica (Costa Rica campus)
 Fredericksburg, Texas
 Junction, Texas
 Lubbock, Texas (Main campus)
 Marble Falls, Texas (Texas Tech University at Highland Lakes)
 McKinney (Collin College campus)
 Rockwall, Texas
 Sherman, Texas (Austin College campus)
 Seville, Spain
 Waco, Texas

Texas Tech University Health Sciences Center
 Abilene, Texas
 Amarillo, Texas
 Dallas, Texas
 Lubbock, Texas
 Mansfield, Texas
 Midland, Texas
 Odessa, Texas

Texas Tech University Health Sciences Center El Paso
 El Paso, Texas

References

External links

 

 
 
Public university systems in the United States